Jouillat is a commune in the Creuse department in the Nouvelle-Aquitaine region in central France.

Geography

Population

Sights
 The church of St. Martial, dating from the twelfth century.
 The fifteenth-century castle.
 The ruins of a fifteenth-century chateau at Bretouilly.

See also
Communes of the Creuse department

References

Communes of Creuse